Maarja-Magdaleena is a village in Tartu Parish, Tartu County, Estonia. It has a population of 256 (as of 1 January 2009).

Maarja-Magdaleena church

References

Villages in Tartu County